Piņķi is a village in Mārupe Municipality, Latvia. Piņķi had 3,434 residents as of 2014.

Towns and villages in Latvia
Mārupe Municipality